Ensdorf can refer to:

Ensdorf, Saarland, a village in the Saarlouis district, Saarland, Germany.
Ensdorf, Bavaria, a village in the Amberg-Sulzbach district, Bavaria, Germany
Ensdorf Abbey, in Ensdorf, Bavaria
Ensdorf-class minesweeper